The term Culture of Macedonia may refer to:

 Culture of Macedonia (region)
 Culture of Ancient Macedonia
 Culture of Macedonia (Greece)
 Culture of North Macedonia
 Culture of Pirin Macedonia (Bulgaria)

See also 
 Macedonian culture (disambiguation)
 Languages of Macedonia (disambiguation)
 Religion in Macedonia (disambiguation)
 Christianity in Macedonia (disambiguation)
 Macedonia (disambiguation)
 Macedonian (disambiguation)